Tait may refer to:

 Tait (band), an American Christian rock band formed by Michael Tait
 Tait (train), a type of train that operated in and near Melbourne, Australia
 Tait or Honey possum, a small marsupial (mammal) of Australia
 Tait Communications, a radio communications company
 Tait Glacier, a glacier on James Ross Island, Antarctica
 Tait River, a river in Minnesota, United States

People
Tait (surname), a surname (including a list of people with the surname)

People with the given name
 Tait Fletcher, American mixed martial artist

See also
 
 Tate (disambiguation)